Linyi East railway station is a railway station in Fanggudun Village, Xianggong Subdistrict, Hedong District, Linyi, Shandong. It is on the Jiaozhou–Xinyi railway. It was opened in 2003. It is  under the jurisdiction of China Railway Jinan Group.

This railway station was formerly known as Linyi North. It was renamed Linyi East on 1 December 2018. The name Linyi North was subsequently reused for a station on the new Rizhao–Lankao high-speed railway.

See also 

 Linyi railway station
 Linyi North railway station

References 

Railway stations in Shandong
Stations on the Jiaozhou–Xinyi railway
Railway stations in China opened in 2003
Railway stations in Linyi